Chaos & Warfare is a split album between the bands Kekal, from Indonesia, and Slechtvalk, from the Netherlands, released in 2002 through Fear Dark Records.

Critical reception of the album was fairly positive, though Kekal’s side of the release drew some criticism from reviewers.  In particular, the band's use of clean vocals was viewed negatively by  HM Magazine writer Matt Morrow, who suggested that the band should have stuck to a solely black metal vocal style. Morrow also leveled heavy criticism at the song "A Stranger So Close". However, some parts of Kekal's material received praise. The song "Mean Attraction" from the band’s previous release, The Painful Experience was called a "hit," and Morrow said that as that song was the best on The Painful Experience, he did not mind it on this release. Morrow also expressed admiration over Kekal's "emotional" and "passionate" cover of the Trouble song "The Skull". Overall, Morrow stated that Kekal was very talented, but held back somewhat by its experimentation. Michiel de Rooij of Lords of Metal praised the tracks "The Only Sound of Rain" and "A Stranger So Close", but found "Mean Attraction" boring and hated the band's cover of "The Skull", as he already disliked Trouble and though the song was performed by a different band he could still not appreciate it.

Slechtvalk's performance was highly praised by Morrow, who stated that he was anticipating the release of the album because of this band's appearance. He did direct some criticism at the first song, "Whispers in the Dark", for using a drum machine, but said that the following three songs, with real drumming, left him speechless. Morrow noted the band’s cover of "Kongsblood", which was originally by Antestor, stating that Slechtvalk did a great job, but that he liked atmosphere of the original version by Antestor better.  de Rooij praised the song "Whispers in the Dark", but found that "The Dragon's Children" and "Storms" were not of the same quality. "Storms" in particular he considered rushed and unoriginal, though not a bad song. "Kongsblood" he lavished with praise, considering it the best on the entire split and writing "I've just listened to it tree [sic] times to obtain a good impression…. and I think I'm going to listen to it once more."  In an interview with Art for the Ears, Slechtvalk founder Shamgar said that while he liked his song "Storms" from the release, he prefers the material found on The War That Plagues the Lands, Slechtvalk's follow-up album.

Overall, Matt Morrow gave the album nine out of ten possible points. Michiel de Rooij rated the split sixty-three out of one hundred. Promonex, a staff reviewer from Metal Storm, graded the entire album eight out of ten points.

Stylistically, Slechtvalk played black metal for most of the album, with "The Dragon's Children" described as a "brutal, pure black metal song" without any keyboards, while the song "Storms" delved into a symphonic black metal style using extremely fast blasting and a mixture of black and death metal vocals.

Track listing

References

Slechtvalk albums
Kekal albums
2002 compilation albums